, commonly referred to as Tateyama, is a mountain located in the southeastern area of Toyama Prefecture, Japan. It is one of Japan's  along with Mount Fuji and Mount Haku. Tateyama consists of three peaks: Ōnanjiyama (大汝山, 3,015 m), Oyama (雄山, 3,003 m), and Fuji-no-Oritateyama, (富士ノ折立, 2,999 m) which run along a ridge (see photo). Tateyama is the tallest mountain in the Tateyama Mountain Range (立山連峰, Tateyama-renpō).

It was first climbed by Saeki no Ariyori during Japan's Asuka period. The area was made the Chūbu-Sangaku National Park on 4 December 1934.

Name
The kanji name for the mountain is 立山, Tateyama in Japanese, which means "standing (立) or outstanding (顕)" and "mountain (山)," respectively. The pronunciation of Tate is two syllables similar to "tah-teh" rather than rhyming with "gate". The Toyama Prefectural Government uses the name Mount Tateyama as an official translation of the Japanese mountain.

Geology

Geography

Location 
Tateyama is located in southeastern Toyama Prefecture. At the base of the mountain is the town of Tateyama which is accessible by train from the prefecture's capital city, Toyama. These are the only glaciers identified in Japan so far.

Nearby mountains

Rivers 
The mountain is the source of the following two rivers, each of which flows to the Sea of Japan.
 Hayatsuki River
 Tsurugi Sawa, tributaries of the Kurobe River

Scenery of Tateyama

References

External links

 Tateyama Kurobe Alpine Route official website

See also
 Chūbu-Sangaku National Park
 Japanese Alps
 List of mountains and hills of Japan by height
 List of three-thousanders in Japan
 Tateyama Kurobe Alpine Route
 Tateyama Sabō Erosion Control Works Service Train
 Tateyama, Toyama
 Tateyama Station (Toyama) 
Murodō Station
Kurobe Dam
Midagahara
Murodō
Tourism in Japan

Hida Mountains
Mount Tate
Mountains of Toyama Prefecture
Sacred mountains
Sacred mountains of Japan
Mount Tate
Mount Tate
Tateyama, Toyama
Shugendō